Mediator of RNA polymerase II transcription subunit 4 also known as mediator complex subunit 4 (MED4), a component of Mediator or vitamin D3 receptor-interacting protein complex 36 kDa component (DRIP36) is a protein that in humans is encoded by the MED4 gene.

Function 

The protein encoded by this gene is a component of the vitamin D receptor-interacting protein (DRIP) complex which functions as a nuclear receptor coactivator. The DRIP complex is capable of activating nuclear receptors in a ligand-dependent manner.

Interactions 

MED4 has been shown to interact with MED25.

References

Further reading